Damnatio ad bestias (Latin for "condemnation to beasts") was a form of Roman capital punishment where the condemned person was killed by wild animals, usually lions or other big cats. This form of execution, which first appeared during the Roman Republic around the 2nd century BC, had been part of a wider class of blood sports called Bestiarii.

The act of damnatio ad bestias was considered a common form of entertainment for the lower class citizens of Rome (plebeians). Killing by wild animals, such as Barbary lions, formed part of the inaugural games of the Flavian Amphitheatre in AD 80. Between the 1st and 3rd centuries AD, this penalty was also applied to the worst of criminals, runaway slaves, and Christians.

History

The exact purpose of the early damnatio ad bestias is not known and might have been a religious sacrifice rather than a legal punishment, especially in the regions where lions existed naturally and were revered by the population, such as Africa, India and other parts of Asia. For example, Egyptian mythology had a chimeric Underworld demon, Ammit, who devoured the souls of exceptionally sinful humans, as well as other lion-like deities, such as Sekhmet, who, according to legend, almost devoured all of humanity soon after her birth. There are also accounts of feeding lions and crocodiles with humans, both dead and alive, in Ancient Egypt and Libya.

Similar condemnations are described by historians of Alexander the Great's campaigns in Central Asia. A Macedonian named Lysimachus, who spoke before Alexander for a person condemned to death, was himself thrown to a lion, but overcame the beast with his bare hands and became one of Alexander's favorites. In northern Africa, during the Mercenary War, Carthaginian general Hamilcar Barca threw prisoners to the beasts, whereas Hannibal forced Romans captured in the Punic Wars to fight each other, and the survivors had to stand against elephants.

Lions were rare in Ancient Rome and human sacrifice was banned there by Numa Pompilius in the 7th century BC, according to legend. Damnatio ad bestias appeared there not as a spiritual practice but rather a spectacle. In addition to lions, other animals were used for this purpose, including bears, leopards, and Caspian tigers. It was combined with gladiatorial combat and was first featured at the Roman Forum and then transferred to the amphitheaters.

Terminology

Whereas the term damnatio ad bestias is usually used in a broad sense, historians distinguish two subtypes: obicĕre bestiis (to throw to beasts) where the humans are defenseless, and damnatio ad bestias, where the punished are both expected and prepared to fight. In addition, there were professional beast fighters trained in special schools, such as the Roman Morning School, which received its name by the timing of the games. These schools taught not only fighting but also the behavior and taming of animals. The fighters were released into the arena dressed in a tunic and armed only with a spear (occasionally with a sword). They were sometimes assisted by venators (hunters), who used bows, spears and whips. Such group fights were not human executions but rather staged animal fighting and hunting. Various animals were used, such as elephants, wild boars, buffaloes, aurochs, bears, lions, tigers, leopards, hyenas, and wolves. The first such staged hunting featured lions and panthers, and was arranged by Marcus Fulvius Nobilior in 186 BC at the Circus Maximus on the occasion of the Greek conquest of Aetolia. The Colosseum and other circuses still contain underground hallways that were used to lead the animals to the arena.

History and description

The custom of submitting criminals to lions was brought to ancient Rome by two commanders, Lucius Aemilius Paullus Macedonicus, who defeated the Macedonians in 167 BC, and his son Scipio Aemilianus, who conquered the African city of Carthage in 146 BC. It was originally a military punishment, possibly borrowed from the Carthaginians. Rome reserved its earliest use for non-Roman military allies found guilty of defection or desertion. The sentenced were tied to columns or thrown to the animals, practically defenseless (i.e. obicĕre bestiis).

Some documented examples of damnatio ad bestias in Ancient Rome include the following: Strabo witnessed the execution of the rebel slaves' leader Selurus. The bandit Laureolus was crucified and then devoured by an eagle and a bear, as described by the poet Martial in his Book of Spectacles. Such executions were also documented by Seneca the Younger (On anger, III 3), Apuleius (The Golden Ass, IV, 13), Titus Lucretius Carus (On the Nature of things) and Petronius Arbiter (Satyricon, XLV). Cicero was indignant that a man was thrown to the beasts to amuse the crowd just because he was considered ugly. Suetonius wrote that when the price of meat was too high, Caligula ordered prisoners, with no discrimination as to their crimes, to be fed to circus animals. Pompey used damnatio ad bestias for showcasing battles and, during his second consulate (55 BC), staged a fight between heavily armed gladiators and 18 elephants.

The most popular animals were tigers, which were imported to Rome in significant numbers specifically for damnatio ad bestias. Brown bears, brought from Gaul, Germany and even North Africa, were less popular. Local municipalities were ordered to provide food for animals in transit and not delay their stay for more than a week. Some historians believe that the mass export of animals to Rome damaged wildlife in North Africa.

Execution of Christians

The use of damnatio ad bestias against Christians began in the 1st century AD. Tacitus states that during the first persecution of Christians under the reign of Nero (after the Fire of Rome in AD 64), people were wrapped in animal skins (called tunica molesta) and thrown to dogs. This practice was followed by other emperors who moved it into the arena and used larger animals. Application of damnatio ad bestias to Christians was intended to equate them with the worst criminals, who were usually punished this way.

There is a widespread view among contemporary specialists that the prominence of Christians among those condemned to death in the Roman arena was greatly exaggerated in earlier times. There is no evidence for Christians being executed at the Colosseum in Rome.

According to Roman laws, Christians were:
 Guilty of high treason (majestatis rei)
 For their worship Christians gathered in secret and at night, making unlawful assembly, and participation in such collegium illicitum or coetus nocturni was equated with a riot.
 For their refusal to honor images of the emperor by libations and incense
 Dissenters from the state gods (άθεοι, sacrilegi)
 Followers of magic prohibited by law (magi, malefici)
 Confessors of a religion unauthorized by the law (religio nova, peregrina et illicita), according to the Twelve Tables).

The spread of the practice of throwing Christians to beasts was reflected by the Christian writer Tertullian (2nd century AD). He states that the general public blamed Christians for any general misfortune and after natural disasters would cry "Away with them to the lions!" This is the only reference from contemporaries mentioning Christians being thrown specifically to lions. Tertullian also wrote that Christians started avoiding theatres and circuses, which were associated with the place of their torture. "The Passion of St. Perpetua, St. Felicitas, and their Companions", a text which purports to be an eyewitness account of a group of Christians condemned to damnatio ad bestias at Carthage in AD 203, states that the men were required to dress in the robes of a priest of the Roman god Saturn, the women as priestesses of Ceres and were shown to the crowd as such. The men and women were brought back out in separate groups and first the men, then the women, exposed to a variety of wild beasts. The victims were chained to poles or elevated platforms. Those who survived the first animal attacks were either brought back out for further exposure to the beasts or executed in public by a gladiator.

The persecution of Christians ceased by the 4th century AD. The Edict of Milan (AD 313) gave them freedom of religion.

Penalty for other crimes
Roman laws, which are known to us through the Byzantine collections, such as the Code of Theodosius and Code of Justinian, defined which criminals could be thrown to beasts (or condemned by other means). They included:
 Deserters from the army
 Those who employed sorcerers to harm others, during the reign of Caracalla. This law was re-established in AD 357 by Constantius II
 Poisoners; by the law of Cornelius, patricians were beheaded, plebeians thrown to lions, and slaves were crucified
 Counterfeiters, who could also be burned alive
 Political criminals. For example, after the overthrow and assassination of Commodus, the new emperor threw to lions both the servants of Commodus and Narcissus who strangled him. Even though Narcissus brought the new emperor to power, he committed a crime of murdering the previous one. The same punishment was applied to Mnesteus who organized the assassination of Emperor Aurelian.
 Patricides, who were normally drowned in a leather bag filled with snakes (poena cullei), but could be thrown to beasts if a suitable body of water was not available.
 Instigators of uprisings, who were either crucified, thrown to beasts or exiled, depending on their social status.
 Those who kidnapped children for ransom, according to the law of AD 315 by the Emperor Constantine the Great, were either thrown to beasts or beheaded.

The sentenced was deprived of civil rights; he could not write a will, and his property was confiscated. Exception from damnatio ad bestias was given to military servants and their children. Also, the law of Petronius (Lex Petronia) of AD 61 forbade employers to send their slaves to be eaten by animals without a judicial verdict. Local governors were required to consult a Roman deputy before staging a fight of skilled gladiators against animals.

The practice of damnatio ad bestias was abolished in Rome in AD 681. It was used once after that in the Byzantine Empire: in 1022, when several disgraced generals were arrested for plotting a conspiracy against Emperor Basil II, they were imprisoned and their property seized, but the royal eunuch who assisted them was thrown to lions.

Notable victims, according to various Christian traditions

 Ignatius of Antioch (AD 107, Rome)
 Glyceria (AD 141, Trayanopolis, Thrace)
 Blandina (AD 177, Lyon)
 Perpetua and Felicity, Saturus and others (AD 203, presumably Carthage)
 Germanicus, second half of the 2nd century, Smyrna, (mentioned in the Martyrdom of Polycarp of Smyrna)
 Euphemia, (AD 303, probably at Chalcedon)
 Marciana of Mauretania, (AD 303, Caesarea, Mauretania Caesariensis)
 Agapius (AD 306, Caesarea)

Survived, according to various legends

 An early description of escape from the death by devouring is in the story of Daniel in the Book of Daniel (c. 2nd century BC).
 The Greek writer Apion (1st century AD) tells the story of a slave Androcles (during Caligula's rule) who was caught after fleeing his master and thrown to a lion. The lion spared him, which Androcles explained by saying that he pulled a thorn from the paw of the very same lion when hiding in Africa, and the lion remembered him.
 Paul (according to apocrypha and the medieval legends, based on his note "when I have fought with beasts at Ephesus", 1 Corinthians, 15:32)
 Thecla, according to the apocryphal story Acts of Paul and Thecla
 An anecdotal escape is reported in the biography of Emperor Gallienus (in the Augustan History). A man was caught after selling the emperor's wife glass instead of gems. Gallienus sentenced him to face lions, but ordered that a capon rather than a lion be let into the arena. The emperor's herald then proclaimed "he has forged, and was treated the same". The merchant was then released.

Description in popular culture

Literature
 Tommaso Campanella in his utopia The City of the Sun suggests using damnatio ad bestias as a form of punishment.
 George Bernard Shaw. Androcles and the Lion
 Henryk Sienkiewicz. Quo Vadis
 Lindsey Davis. Two for the Lions

Film
 Fights against wild animals in the arena of the Roman Colosseum were displayed in Gladiator (2000) and other films.

Music
 The Canadian death metal band Ex Deo has a song titled "Pollice Verso (Damnatio ad Bestia)" on the album Caligvla.
 The British Black Metal band Cradle of Filth has a song titled "You will know the Lion by his Claw" and uses this line in its lyrics.
 The Hungarian black metal band Harloch: has an album Damnatio ad bestias.

See also

 Animal trial
 Atlas bear
 Blood sport
 Damnatio memoriae
 Execution by elephant
 Persecution of Christians in the Roman Empire
 Public execution

References

Bibliography

Further reading
 
 
 

Gladiatorial combat
Execution methods
Latin words and phrases
Capital punishment in ancient Rome
Deaths due to animal attacks